Nischarin is a protein that in humans is encoded by the NISCH gene.

Function 

This gene encodes a nonadrenergic imidazoline-1 receptor protein that localizes to the inner layer of the plasma membrane as well as early and recycling endosome membranes. It is a scaffold protein related to Sorting nexins and it regulates protein cargo traffic. The orthologous mouse protein has been shown to influence cytoskeletal organization and cell migration by binding to alpha-5-beta-1 integrin. In humans, this protein has been shown to bind to the adapter insulin receptor substrate 4 (IRS4) to mediate translocation of alpha-5 integrin from the cell membrane to endosomes. In human cardiac tissue, this gene was found to affect cell growth and death while in neural tissue it affected neuronal growth and differentiation.

Clinical significance 

Expression of this protein was reduced in human breast cancers while its overexpression reduced tumor growth and metastasis; possibly by limiting the expression of alpha-5 integrin.

Interactions 

NISCH has been shown to interact with IRS4, Integrin alpha 5, and small GTPases Rac1, Rab4a, Rab9a, Rab14 and Rab38 in GTP-bound form. NISCH also interacts with phospholipid PI(3)P via its PX domain.

See also 
 Imidazoline receptor

References

Further reading